Mikhail Aleksandrovich Ignatov (born 4 May 2000) is a Russian football player. He plays for FC Spartak Moscow as an attacking midfielder.

Club career
He made his debut in the Russian Football National League for FC Spartak-2 Moscow on 5 March 2018 in a game against FC Fakel Voronezh.

He made his debut for the main squad of FC Spartak Moscow on 20 September 2018 in a Europa League game against Rapid Wien.

He made his Russian Premier League debut in Spartak's next game on 23 September 2018 against PFC CSKA Moscow. In his next league game for Spartak and first as a starter, he scored his first goal in a 3–2 victory over FC Yenisey Krasnoyarsk on 7 October 2018.

On 21 January 2022, he extended his contract with Spartak until June 2025.

Honours
Spartak Moscow
Russian Cup: 2021–22

Career statistics

References

External links
 
 
 Profile by Russian Football National League

2000 births
Footballers from Moscow
Living people
Association football midfielders
Russian footballers
Russia youth international footballers
Russia under-21 international footballers
FC Spartak Moscow players
FC Spartak-2 Moscow players
Russian Premier League players
Russian First League players